Citheronia mexicana is a species of moth in the family Saturniidae. It can be found in Belize, Mexico and Guatemala.

References

Moths described in 1866
Ceratocampinae